Victor Bérard (Morez, 10 August 1864 – Paris, 13 November 1931) was a French diplomat and politician.

Today, he is still renowned for his works about Hellenistic studies and geography of the Odyssey. Bérard's "L'Angleterre et l'impérialisme" was translated into English and published in 1906 as "British imperialism and commercial supremacy" (Longmans, Green, London, New York).

Bibliography 
 L'Angleterre et l'Impérialisme, Armand Colin, Paris, 1900
 Les Phéniciens et l'Odyssée (1902–1903, re-ed. 1927), Armand Colin, Paris, 1902–1903 (and 1927)
 Les navigations d'Ulysse, Armand Colin, Paris, 1927–1929 (and 1971)
 La Résurrection d'Homère, Bernard Grasset, Paris, 1930

References

People from Jura (department)
1864 births
1931 deaths
École Normale Supérieure alumni
French archaeologists
French hellenists
French diplomats
19th-century French historians
20th-century French historians
French classical scholars
Members of the French School at Athens
Senators of Jura (department)
Homeric scholars
Foreign members of the Serbian Academy of Sciences and Arts